Olomu was a paramount traditional ruler of Iwoye-Ketu, a town in Ogun State, southwestern Nigeria.
He was the pioneer King of "Iwoye Ketu" who brought Orisa Oluwa, a deity of Yoruba mythology that forbids the use of Umbrella in Iwoye-Ketu.

References

Yoruba monarchs
Nigerian traditional rulers